Hispasat Advanced Generation 1 (Hispasat AG1), also designated Hispasat 36W-1, is a Spanish communications satellite which is part of the Hispasat fleet. It was successfully launched to GTO on 28 January 2017.

The satellite will serve Spain, Portugal and the Americas.

See also 
Hispasat 30W-6

References

External links 
Hispasat 36W-1 official page

Communications satellites in geostationary orbit
Satellites of Spain
Spacecraft launched in 2017
2017 in Spain
Spacecraft launched by Soyuz-2 rockets